1803 was the 17th season of cricket in England since the foundation of Marylebone Cricket Club (MCC). Thomas Howard made his debut in important matches.

Honours
 Most runs – Lord Frederick Beauclerk 284 at 35.50 (HS 74)
 Most wickets – Lord Frederick Beauclerk 12

Events
 Prime Minister William Pitt referred to cricket when introducing his Defence Bill.
 With the Napoleonic War continuing, loss of investment and manpower impacted cricket and only three first-class matches have been recorded in 1803:
21–24 June: All-England v Surrey at Lord's Old Ground
4–6 July: Nottinghamshire & Leicestershire v Hampshire at Lord's Old Ground
11–12 July: All-England v Surrey at Lord's Old Ground
 Another match that has sometimes been regarded as important is H. C. Woolridge's XI v W. R. Capel's XI at Clifford's Park, Rickmansworth, on Friday 26 August. It was originally classified as an important match by the ACS (and thus with first-class status), but the ACS subsequently downgraded its status because of the weak standard of Capel's XI (only three players are known to have played in other first-class matches) and it was possibly scheduled for only one day.

Debutants
1803 debutants included:
 Thomas Howard (Hampshire)
 Goddard (Hampshire)
 John Pointer (Hampshire)
 John Sparks (Surrey)
 Joseph Dennis
 James Lawrell

References

Bibliography

Further reading
 
 
 
 
 Britcher, Samuel, A list of all the principal Matches of Cricket that have been played (1790 to 1805), annual series
 

1803 in English cricket
English cricket seasons in the 19th century